Ivry Gitlis (‎ 25 August 1922 – 24 December 2020) was an Israeli virtuoso violinist and UNESCO Goodwill Ambassador. He performed with the world's top orchestras, including the London Philharmonic, New York Philharmonic, Berlin Philharmonic, Vienna Philharmonic, Philadelphia Orchestra, and Israel Philharmonic Orchestra.

Early life and education
Yitzhak-Meir (Isaac) Gitlis was born on 25 August 1922 in Haifa, Israel to Jewish parents, who emigrated in 1921 from Kamianets-Podilskyi, Ukraine.

Gitlis acquired his first violin when he was five years old and started lessons under Mme Velikovsky together with his friend Zvi Zeitlin. He then studied privately with Mira Ben-Ami, a pupil of Joseph Szigeti. When he was eight, she arranged for him to play for Bronisław Huberman, which prompted a fundraising campaign to allow him to study in France.

In 1933, he arrived with his mother in Paris and started to take lessons with Marcel Chailley, husband of the pianist Céliny Chailley-Richez. Being very close to their family, he was introduced to George Enescu and Jacques Thibaud. In that period, he decided to change his birth name (Isaac)) to Ivry. At 11, Gitlis (Jitlis) entered the Conservatoire de Paris in the class of Jules Boucherit, and graduated in 1935.

In 1938–1940, his teachers included George Enescu and Jacques Thibaud in Paris and Carl Flesch in Spa, Belgium and later in London.

Career

World War 2
In 1940, during World War II, he went to London where he first worked for two years in a war factory and was then assigned to the artists branch of the British Army. He gave numerous concerts for the Allied soldiers and in war factories. After the war he made his successful debut with the London Philharmonic Orchestra and subsequently played with the BBC and all other principal orchestras of Great Britain.

1950s
In 1951, as suggested by his teacher Alice Pashkus, he participated in the Long-Thibaud Competition in Paris, where he took fifth place. During the preliminary stages of the competition, a rumor circulated that he had stolen a Stradivarius violin during the war, which caused a scandal on the day of the final. Six years after the fall of Hitler, being a Jew in France was still causing debate.
In the same year, Gitlis made his debut in Paris, playing in a recital at the Salle Gaveau, sponsored by the music manager Marcel de Valmalète (9 July 1951).

In the 1950s, he moved to the United States where he met Jascha Heifetz. There he made several tours, managed by Sol Hurok, including those conducted by Eugene Ormandy (Tchaikovsky, in Philadelphia) and George Szell (Sibelius, on 15,16 and 18 December 1955 in New York). Back in Europe, between 1954 and 1955, he recorded for the Vox label concertos by Berg (Violin Concerto "To the memory of an angel", coupled with "Chamber Concerto" -Vox PL 8660- which was awarded a "Grand Prix du Disque" in 1954), Tchaikovsky, Mendelssohn, Stravinsky (Violin Concerto, coupled with "Duo Concertant") and with the conductor Jascha Horenstein, Bartók, Bruch and Sibelius. His recording of Bartók's 2nd Violin Concerto and Solo Violin Sonata -Vox PL 9020- received the "Best Record of the Year" award from the New York Herald Tribune in 1955.

1960s
In 1963, he was the first Israeli violinist to play in the Soviet Union. He gave a series of concerts under the cultural exchange program of the Soviet Union and Israel, starting in Vilnius (23 October 1963). His other concerts were given in Moscow, Leningrad, Kiev and Odessa.

In 1968, he participated in The Rolling Stones Rock and Roll Circus film project, performing "Whole Lotta Yoko" with Yoko Ono and The Dirty Mac, recently released on DVD.

Many composers were fascinated by his sound and way of playing, among whom René Leibowitz who dedicated his Violin Concerto, Op. 50 (1958) to him; Roman Haubenstock-Ramati with "Sequences" for Violin and Orchestra (1958); Bruno Maderna writing "Pièce pour Ivry" (1971), which Gitlis never recorded commercially, but recorded live in Paris on 25 May 1983; Yannis Xenakis with "Mikka", which Gitlis premièred in 1972; Charles Harold Bernstein with two works for solo violin, inspired by Gitlis, "Rhapsodie Israélienne" and "Romantic Suite" (1984).

1970s
In 1972, Gitlis founded the Festival de Vence, famous for its innovative programming. He was also the inspirer and organiser of the Saint André de Cubzac, Alfortville and Bonifacio Music Festivals.

In 1975, he undertook a dramatic role, as Hypnotist in François Truffaut's film, The Story of Adele H.

He often visited Japan, where he was very popular.

1990s
In 1990, Gitlis was designated UNESCO Goodwill Ambassador. His stated aim was the "support of education and culture of peace and tolerance". He performed at the opening event of the International Bioethics Committee's 3rd session in 1995.

2000s

Ivry Gitlis was a commentator (along with Itzhak Perlman) on the DVD The Art of Violin (2000), which showcases violin performances and gives biographical details of many of the great violinists of the twentieth century.

In 2008, he became patron of the Paris-based association "Inspiration(s)", whose aim is to make classical music accessible to all. He was a Fellow of the Royal Northern College of Music.

He was a distinguished guest of the International Master Course for violinists and string players at Keshet Eilon Music Center.

Violins
At various stages in his career, Gitlis played on a 1699 Giovanni Battista Rogeri, which he sold to famed violin author Sidney Bowden, the 1737 "Chant du Cygne" Antonio Stradivari, and the 1740 "Ysaye" Guarneri del Gesù. Ivry Gitlis owned the 1713 "Sancy" Antonio Stradivari and a violin by Émile Marcel Français, Paris 1944 (won as a prize for the 1951 "Thibaud Competition").

Quotes

 "... don't be so polite with the music, it's like being in love!" (IG, during a masterclass, 31 October 2011)
 "Sheet music is a bunch of black marks; they have no significance ... I play violin, but in order to play well you have to be much more than a violin player. There is an entire world that lives together with it, like the currents in the ocean; and in any event, often I don't use sheet music at all, but improvise." (IG, October 2012)
 "... rubato is the art of playing in tempo..." (IG)
 (on answering the question: "what is your motto?") "... to be alive, to be aware, to hear, to know, to feel, to see, to love, to be loved a little bit sometimes." (IG, July 2011)

Personal life
Since the end of the 1960s, Gitlis  resided in Paris, France. He died there on 24 December 2020 at the age of 98.

Ivry Gitlis Edition - Rhine Classics
 RH-011 | 2CD | IVRY GITLIS - the early years
 RH-019 | 9CD | IVRY GITLIS - in memoriam "inédits et introuvables"
 RH-024 | 1CD | IVRY GITLIS - plays Bach

Audio/video recordings
Sortable lists, in chronological order.

Commercial – official, studio and live releases

Filmography

References 
Notes

Sources
 Gitlis, Ivry, L’Âme et la corde  (2nd edition, Buchet-Chastel, Paris 2013)  (FR)

Further reading
 Ben Zeev, Noam: "At 90, master violinist wants to bestow his knowledge onto a new generation", Haaretz, 5 October 2012
 Campion, Alexis: "Ivry Gitlis, esprit violon", le JDD, 14 December 2013 (FR)
 Coppey, Nicole: Interview to Ivry Gitlis, "se créer au moment de créer" Revue musicale suisse, July/August 2008 (FR)
 Sánchez-Penzo, José: "The way famous instruments went", relevant well informed website
 Price, Jason: 94th birthday interview with violinist Ivry Gitlis about his incredible 60-year relationship with his Stradivari ‘Sancy’ violin, 1715 (10-minute video)
 Daily Telegraph: Obituary Ivry Gitlis 29 Dec 2020

External links

 

1922 births
2020 deaths
Israeli classical violinists
Male classical violinists
Jewish classical violinists
Jewish violinists
Long-Thibaud-Crespin Competition prize-winners
Israeli people of Russian-Jewish descent
Israeli people of Ukrainian-Jewish descent
People from Haifa
The Dirty Mac members
UNESCO Goodwill Ambassadors
21st-century classical violinists
21st-century male musicians